The Hyundai Pavise is a truck produced by the South Korean manufacturer Hyundai. It is produced in both right and left hand drive versions.

History 
The Pavise was announced on August 29, 2019, in South Korea.

The Pavise is the successor to the Mega Truck and can carry 5.5 tons. The combined transmission is a ZF 12-speed AMT.

References 

Pavise